Muthui is a Kenyan name that may refer to the following people:
Muthui Kariuki (born 1956), Kenyan journalist
Samuel Muthui (born 1987), Kenyan businessman

References